The 1973 FIBA European Championship, commonly called FIBA EuroBasket 1973, was the eighteenth FIBA EuroBasket regional basketball championship, held by FIBA Europe.

Venues

Group stage

Group A – Badalona

Group B – Barcelona

Knockout stage

5th to 8th place

9th to 12th place

Final standings

Awards

Team rosters
1. Yugoslavia: Krešimir Ćosić, Dražen Dalipagić, Dragan Kićanović, Zoran Slavnić, Nikola Plećaš, Željko Jerkov, Vinko Jelovac, Damir Šolman, Rato Tvrdić, Milun Marović, Žarko Knežević, Dragi Ivković (Coach: Mirko Novosel)

2. Spain: Clifford Luyk, Wayne Brabender, Francisco "Nino" Buscato, Vicente Ramos, Rafael Rullan, Manuel Flores, Luis Miguel Santillana, Carmelo Cabrera, Gonzalo Sagi-Vela, Jose Luis Sagi-Vela, Miguel Angel Estrada, Enrique Margall (Coach: Antonio Díaz-Miguel)

3. Soviet Union: Sergei Belov, Modestas Paulauskas, Anatoly Myshkin, Ivan Edeshko, Zurab Sakandelidze, Sergei Kovalenko, Valeri Miloserdov, Evgeni Kovalenko, Aleksander Boloshev, Yuri Pavlov, Jaak Salumets, Nikolai Djachenko (Coach: Vladimir Kondrashin)

4. Czechoslovakia: Jiří Zídek Sr., Kamil Brabenec, Zdenek Kos, Jiří Zedníček, Jan Bobrovsky, Jiri Pospisil, Petr Novicky, Jan Blažek, Josef Klima, Vojtech Petr, Jiri Balastik, Gustav Hraska (Coach: Vladimir Heger)

References

1973
1973–74 in European basketball
1973–74 in Spanish basketball
International basketball competitions hosted by Spain
International basketball competitions hosted by Catalonia